Ngā Tamatoa (The Warriors) was a Māori activist group that operated throughout the 1970s to promote Māori rights, fight racial discrimination, and confront injustices perpetrated by the New Zealand Government, particularly violations of the Treaty of Waitangi.

Origins
Ngā Tamatoa emerged from a conference at the University of Auckland organised by academic and historian Ranginui Walker. The group consisted of mainly urban and university-educated Māori who were offended by continuing confiscation of land and degradation of the Māori language.  The group was inspired by international liberation and indigenous movements such as the Black Panther Party and the American Indian Movement which characterised the New Left of the 1970s internationally. Syd Jackson, one of the founding members of Ngā Tamatoa, drew from the works of Eldridge Cleaver and Stokely Carmichael. Ngā Tamatoa often worked alongside the Polynesian Panthers, who also drew direct inspiration from the Black Panther Party.

Member Taura Eruera said of the group's beginning "Our tohu at the time was tama tu, tama ora, tama noho, tama mate, tamatoa — meaning stand up and do something, don't sit and do nothing." 

Members of Ngā Tamatoa included Hone Harawira and his mother Titewhai Harawera, Donna Awatere Huata, Tame Iti, Josephine Keelan, Jim Moriarty, Rawiri Paratene, Larry Parr, Hana Te Hemara, Kura Te Waru Reweri, Linda Tuhiwai Smith, Brya Taylor, Ngahuia Te Awekotuku, Vernon Winitana and Tiata Witehira. Tama Poata was a member who was also involved in other activist groups, Māori Organisation On Human Rights and Halt All Racist Tours (HART) and was influential in the film and TV industry. Member Taitimu Maipi recounts the leadership of women in Ngā Tamatoa describing efforts by Hilda Harawera in Māori language activism.

Māori language
In September 1972, Ngā Tamatoa presented a petition with more than 30,000 signatures to the Crown to have Māori taught in schools. Titewhai Harawera was strongly involved in this campaign for the Māori language with Ngā Tamatoa. She said in 2009:We were determined to rescue our language because we felt and we believed, and we believe today, that a people without its language is a people that die.Other initiatives by the organisation helped to enforce real social and political changes in New Zealand which has seen the establishment of Māori language nests, Kōhanga Reo, and the Kura Kaupapa Māori immersion schools. In 1987, the Māori Language Act was passed by the New Zealand Government, giving Te Reo Māori (Māori language) official language status.

1975 Land March
Ngā Tamatoa organised the historic 1975 Land March, led by Dame Whina Cooper, from the top of New Zealand's North Island to Parliament in Wellington. Following the march, Ngā Tamatoa created a 'Tent Embassy' by camping on Parliament grounds in Wellington, demanding immediate action on land march issues.

He Taua 1979
The organisation was involved in disrupting the University of Auckland haka party, a part of the annual student capping parade. This was annual parade in which engineering students parodied the Māori haka, by painting male genitals on their body and performing with sexually obscene gestures. The disruption was mainly organised by a group of Māori and Pacific Island students, called He Taua 'War Party.' Following a violent attack on  the engineering students, when several students were assaulted, members of He Taua were arrested. Their court case in Auckland sparked anti-racism protests outside the courthouse. Members of He Taua included Hone Harawira, later a Member of Parliament.

Treaty of Waitangi
Ngā Tamatoa initiated the annual protests at Waitangi on Waitangi Day, in 1973 after Prime Minister Norman Kirk changed the name of the day to 'New Zealand Day'. The group claimed that the "Treaty is a fraud" because of the ongoing breaches committed by the Government. Ngā Tamatoa wore black armbands to the celebrations to mourn the loss of Māori land much of which had been confiscated or annexed by state legislation. The Auckland Māori Council declared their support of the protest by making a submission that cited fourteen statutes that were currently breaching the Treaty.

References

Further reading
Ranginui Walker, Nga Tau Tohetohe-Years of Anger, Auckland, 1987
Ranginui Walker, Ka Whawhai Tonu Matou-Struggle Without End, Auckland, 1990
Aroha Harris, Hikoi: Forty years of Maori Protest, Auckland, 2004

External links
Photo of Nga Tamatoa at Parliament steps 1972

History of New Zealand
Treaty of Waitangi
Race relations in New Zealand
Māori politics
Māori organisations
Māori history